The Ministry of Social Security commonly known as BoAn (Hanja: 保安) is a law enforcement agency in North Korea.

Unlike most ministers in North Korea, which operate under the Cabinet, the Ministry of Social Security is directly supervised by the State Affairs Commission. The current minister is Ri Yong-gil.

According to Fyodor Tertitskiy, columnist at NK News, prospective officers are chosen by recommendation by a local WPK Committee, although some are chosen because of their songbun status. He further contends that bribery represents a regular aspect of interactions between North Koreans and the police.

History
The ministry was first created as the Political Security Bureau (Korean: 정치보안국) on November 19, 1945. The bureau became a subordinate to the Ministry of Internal Affairs in September 1948. The bureau became a separate ministry known as the Ministry of Social Security (Korean: 사회안전성) in May 1951. However, the ministry was later merged back with the Ministry of Internal Affairs in October 1952.

The Ministry of Social Security was re-established in October 1962 after splitting from the Ministry of Internal Affairs. It became the Social Security Department (Korean: 사회안전부) in December 1972. The department was a subordinate to the Administration Council. In April 1982, the department was split from the Administration Council  but was later returned to its control in December 1986.

The department was renamed back to the Ministry of Social Security in September 1998 and became subordinate to the Cabinet. In April 2000, the name of the ministry was changed to Ministry of People's Security (Korean: 인민보안성). In April 2010, the ministry became the People's Security Department (Korean: 인민보안부) and was transferred to the control of the National Defence Commission.

In 2016, the department was renamed back to the Ministry of People's Security and became subordinate to the State Affairs Commission.

In May 2020, it was changed back to the Ministry of Social Security.

Duties
Beyond policing, its services include operating the prison system in North Korea which is part of the Corrections Bureau of the Ministry of Social Security, monitoring the public distribution system and providing bodyguards to important persons.

The Ministry of Social Security gathers information from local informers in social units about irregular acts. If a case is believed to be of a political nature, it is instead handed over to the Ministry of State Security for investigation.

Structure

Korean People's Social Security Forces
The Korean People's Social Security Forces formerly known as People's Guards Forces is subordinated to the ministry is in charge of security for major national facilities such as military demarcation lines, borders, and coastal security, as well as government buildings, Yongbyon nuclear facilities, power plants, and broadcasting facilities. It is the country's national gendarmerie and civil defense organization organized in military lines.

In the 1980s, the work of the People's Guards was transferred to the National Security Agency, and the border guard was believed to have passed to the People's Armed Forces Ministry in October 1996. In 2010 the then People's Security Forces became the People's Internal Security Forces, and in 2020 was renamed as the People's Social Security Forces.

Equipment

 Paektusan Pistol- 9×19mm, North Korean (DPRK) locally made copy of the CZ-75 pistol.
 Type 68 Pistol- 7.62×25mm, North Korean copy of the TT-33 Pistol.
 Type 70 Pistol- .32 ACP, North Korean indigenous pistol that is considered to be a copy of the Makarov PM and Walther PPK. Used by K-9 officers in some cases and for standard patrolman and patrolwomen. 
Type 58 assault rifle and Type 68 assault rifle- 7.62×39mm, North Korean (DPRK) locally made version of the AK-47 and AKM. Used by Ministry of Social Security Corrections Bureau guards.
 Type 88 assault rifle- 5.45×39mm, North Korean (DPRK) copy of the AK-74 assault rifle.
Type 73 light machine gun- 7.62×54mmR, North Korean (DPRK) locally made light machine gun that takes usually a magazine which is on the top of the gun similar to a Bren Gun in appearance with aspects of the PK machine gun and the ZB vz.26.
 RPG-7

Ministers of Interior
 Pak Il-u  (박일우) (2.9.1948)
Pang Hak Se (방학세) (1952–1960)
Pak Mun-gyu (박문규) (23.10.1960–22.10-1962 and 23.10.1962)
Pak Song-chol (박성철) (1.12.1967)

Ministers of Social Security
Choe Pu-il (2013-2020)
Kim Jong-ho  (2020-January 2021)
Ri Yong-gil January 2021 - July 2021
Kim Jong-ho July 2021- September 2021
Jang Jong-nam September 2021 - December 2021 
Ri Thae-sop December 2021-June 2022
Park Su-il - June 2022 - December 2022
Ri Thae-sop - 28 December 2022 - present

Ranks

See also
Amrokkang Sports Club
Rimyongsu Sports Club

References

Law enforcement in North Korea
Government agencies of North Korea